The Men's shot put at the 2014 Commonwealth Games as part of the athletics programme took place at Hampden Park on 27 and 28 July 2014.

Results

Qualifying round

Final qualification mark was set at 20.00 metres, and athletes reaching that marked qualified for the final. Where less than twelve made the mark, the first twelve athletes were to qualify for the final as of right. In the event, three athletes qualified through reaching the mark; the next nine qualified for the final without reaching the mark.

New Zealand's Tomas Walsh was the best mark from the first round, at 21.24 metres, a new Commonwealth Games record

Final

References

Men's shot put
2014